Club Atlético Torque is a Uruguayan professional association football club based in Montevideo, who currently play in the Uruguayan Segunda División. The list covers the period from 2008 (when the club joined the Uruguayan football league system) to the present day.

Background 
Club Atlético Torque entered the Uruguayan league pyramid at the third tier, in the Uruguayan Segunda División Amateur. They competed at this level for four years, although contested they also contested a promotion play-off match in their inaugural season, before winning promotion to the Uruguayan Segunda División, at which level they have competed ever since.

As a South American side, a number of Torque's seasons have been based around the principle of Apertura and Clausura tournaments, where the league season is broken into two halves, with a separate league table recorded for each. The exact structure of Uruguayan football has frequently been in flux, meaning that the exact organisation of these tournaments - such as whether teams qualify for promotion based on whole-season form or via success in either of the two halves of the season, and whether automatic promotion places exist or not - has altered several times, as indeed has whether the seasons have been divided up into Apertura and Clausura tournaments in the first place.

Seasons 
Correct as of end of the 2019 season

References

External links 
 Uruguayan league histories at rsssf.com

Montevideo City Torque
Uruguayan football club seasons